Merlin Crossley is an Australian molecular biologist, university teacher and administrator. In 2016, he was appointed as Deputy Vice-Chancellor (Academic) at the University of New South Wales.

Early life and career
Crossley attended Mount View Primary School, Glen Waverley, Victoria, then was awarded an entrance scholarship to Melbourne Grammar School, where he was dux. He undertook a Bachelor of Science at the University of Melbourne, as a resident of Queen's College (University of Melbourne), then a doctorate at the University of Oxford supported by a Rhodes Scholarship at Magdalen College, Oxford. He worked at Oxford, Harvard and the University of Sydney, before moving to UNSW as Dean of Science. In recognition of his service on the Trust of the Australian Museum a new species of butterfly bobtail squid was named in his honour - Iridoteuthis merlini - Merlin's bobtail squid.

Research
Crossley is interested in gene regulation. He studied an unusual genetic disorder termed Haemophilia B Leyden where patients recover after puberty. The condition results from mutations that disrupt the control region of the clotting factor IX gene.
A testosterone-responsive element accounts for post-pubertal recovery. He has also investigated abnormal patterns of globin gene expression and his work on mutations associated with the lifelong expression of the foetal haemoglobin gene may help in the treatment of thalassemia and sickle cell anaemia. He is using CRISPR-mediated gene editing to introduce beneficial mutations in cell lines as models for treating genetic diseases.

He is also known for the initial identification and cloning of a significant number of genes encoding DNA-binding proteins and their associated co-regulators, KLF3, KLF8, KLF17, EOS IKZF4, PEGASUS, FOG1 ZFPM1, FOG2 ZFPM2, and CTBP2.

Other activities
He has contributed numerous articles on molecular genetics and education to newspapers and media outlets such as The Conversation (website) and has promoted science communication, for instance as a member of the judging panel for the annual anthology, Best Australian Science Writing. He is Deputy Director of the Australian Science Media Centre (AusSMC), has served on the Trust of the Australian Museum 2012-20  and the Board of the Sydney Institute of Marine Science 2010-15, and is on the Board of, and Chair of the Editorial Board of The Conversation (website).

Honours and awards
 Lemberg Medal, Australian Society of Biochemistry and Molecular Biology - 2021 
 NSW Premier's Prize for Excellence in Medical Biological Sciences - 2020 
 Fellow of the Royal Society of New South Wales - 2014 
 Fellow of Queen's College (University of Melbourne) - 2013 
 Julian Wells Medal, Lorne Genome Conference - 2010 
 Australian Academy of Science Gottschalk Medal - 2002 
 Royal Society of New South Wales Sir Edgeworth David Medal - 2000 
 Australian Society for Biochemistry and Molecular Biology Roche Medal - 1999 
 Rhodes Scholarship 1987 -1990

References 

Living people
Year of birth missing (living people)
Scientists from Melbourne
Molecular biologists
Academic staff of the University of New South Wales
University of Melbourne alumni
Australian molecular biologists
Alumni of Magdalen College, Oxford
Australian Rhodes Scholars
Harvard University faculty
Academic staff of the University of Sydney
People educated at Melbourne Grammar School